Earl Kenneth Shriner is an American criminal who in 1990 was convicted of first-degree attempted murder, first-degree rape and first-degree assault of seven-year-old Ryan Alan Hade and sentenced to 131 years' imprisonment.

Criminal career 

Shriner, who was described as "a slightly retarded man with a bizarre physical appearance" and tested to have an IQ of 67 had a long history of sadistic sexual assaults but only one conviction. "Shriner was in the community without supervision because his sentence had expired and a judge had ruled that he did not meet the stringent 'imminent danger' criteria necessary for commitment under the State's mental health laws."

In 1966, when Shriner, at that time 16, was detained for strangling a seven-year-old girl, he led the police officers to the body of a developmentally disabled 15-year-old girl instead, whom he had strangled. He was confined to 10 years, but committed as a 'defective delinquent' to a hospital, but not convicted of a crime. Between 1977 and 1987, while serving a 10-year sentence for abducting and assaulting two 16-year-old girls, Shriner had repeatedly disclosed not just fantasies but detailed plans how he would kidnap, confine, and torture his victims.

Reactions

Sexually violent predator legislation 

The final sexual assault Shriner committed in May 1989, caused a nationwide public outrage, that has been cited as one of the main catalysts for new laws allowing indefinite confinement of sex offenders. The formation of a victims advocacy group Tennis Shoe Brigade, named in reference to the grass-roots organizations demand that the public be free to walk the streets in safety, rallying for toughening the laws, raised the public pressure on Washington's Governor Booth Gardner. Subsequently, the Washington state legislature unanimously enacted the first "sexual predator" law, allowing to indefinitely lock up perpetrators of any sexual crime, if a "mental abnormality" causing someone to commit another sex crime can be attested. A pivotal part of the 1990 Community Protection Act (Washington) this legislation was subsequently adopted by many other U.S. states.  Many people also became outraged that such a clearly dangerous sexual predator had been allowed to live in anonymity prior to the killings, and some people thought that the killings could have been avoided if people had been aware of Shriner's criminal history. As a result, the Community Protection Act also not only created a sex offender registry in Washington state, but also required community notification of the presence of the  state's most dangerous sex offenders. The Community Protection Act thus is generally considered to have created the world's first publicly accessible sex offender registry; all other sex offender registries existing before this point were only available to law enforcement.

Animal abuse 

Shriner was also cited by PETA in their campaign against animal abuse as an example of notorious criminals that started torturing animals long before turning to children. The Animals' Voice describes him as "being widely known in his neighborhood as the man who put firecrackers in dogs' rectums and strung up cats".

See also
Special Commitment Center
Sex offender registries in the United States

Notes

References
 Michael Petrunik: “Models of dangerousness: Across jurisdictional review of dangerousness legislation and practice”, Services gouvermentaux Canada, 1994, .
 Franziska Lamott, Friedemann Pfäfflin: “Sind Straftäter Tiere?” in: Irmgard Rode et al. (eds.): Paradigmenwechsel im Strafverfahren: Neurobiologie auf dem Vormarsch, Berlin, 2008, p. 99-126
 The Association for the Treatment of Sexual Abusers (ATSA) http://www.atsa.com/ppOffenderFacts.html

External links 
Crime Library

Year of birth missing (living people)
American people convicted of rape
American rapists
American people convicted of murder
Living people
American people convicted of child sexual abuse
American murderers of children